The 2014–15 North Carolina Tar Heels women's basketball team will represent the University of North Carolina at Chapel Hill during the 2014–15 NCAA Division I women's basketball season. The Tar Heels, led by twenty-ninth year head coach Sylvia Hatchell, play their games at Carmichael Arena and were members of the Atlantic Coast Conference. They finished the season 26–9, 10–6 ACC play to finish in sixth place. They advanced to the quarterfinals of the ACC women's tournament where they lost to Louisville. They received at-large bid of the NCAA women's tournament where they defeated Liberty in the first round, Ohio State in the second round before losing to South Carolina in the sweet sixteen.

Roster

Schedule

|-
!colspan=9 style="background:#56A0D3; color:#FFFFFF;"|Exhibition

|-
!colspan=9 style="background:#56A0D3; color:#FFFFFF;"| Non-conference regular season

|-
!colspan=9 style="background:#56A0D3; color:#FFFFFF;"| ACC Regular Season

|-
!colspan=9 style="background:#56A0D3;"| ACC Women's Tournament

|-
!colspan=9 style="background:#56A0D3;"| NCAA Women's Tournament

Source

Rankings
2014–15 NCAA Division I women's basketball rankings

See also
2014–15 North Carolina Tar Heels men's basketball team

References

North Carolina
North Carolina Tar Heels women's basketball seasons
North Car
North Car